Reign Supreme is the seventh studio album by Dying Fetus. It was released on June 19, 2012 in the United States, June 22, 2012 in Germany, and June 25, 2012 in Europe.

Deluxe editions feature expanded artwork, a sticker, and the bonus track, "Dead Whores Love to Fuck".

"Second Skin" is featured on the season 23 episode Band in China of the show South Park as one of the songs the fictional band Crimson Dawn performs.

Background
Commented Dying Fetus guitarist/vocalist John Gallagher: "The last album had some groove in it, but [it] was basically a lot of tech; this one is a return to form of older Fetus albums, so to speak — more modern production, though, of course. Everything's tight, the sound is crushing, the drums are amazing."

Track listing

Credits 
Writing, performance and production credits are adapted from the album liner notes.

Personnel

Dying Fetus 
 John Gallagher – guitars, vocals
 Sean Beasley – bass, vocals
 Trey Williams – drums

Production 
 Steve Wright – production, engineering, mixing, mastering
 Dying Fetus – production
 Noah Gary – additional engineering
 Sarah Fabiszak – additional engineering

Artwork and design 
 Orion Landau – artwork

Charts

References

External links 
 

2012 albums
Dying Fetus albums
Relapse Records albums